The Manistee River, seldom referred to as the Big Manistee River, runs  through the northwestern Lower Peninsula of Michigan; it now passes through the contemporary villages of Sharon, Smithville, and Mesick, entering Lake Michigan at Manistee. It is considered, like the nearby Au Sable River, to be one of the best trout fisheries east of the Rockies. The Manistee River is also being considered for restoration of Arctic grayling, which have been extirpated from the State of Michigan since 1936.

History
The name "Manistee" is from an Ojibwe word whose derivation is uncertain. However, it may be from ministigweyaa, "river with islands at its mouth". The Ojibwe (Chippewa in the United States) and Ottawa peoples lived along the river, with the Ottawa having a reservation on the river from 1836. The federally recognized Little River Band of Ottawa Indians continues to occupy its reservation in Manistee County, as well as lands in Mason County.

Historically, the upper river was renowned for its outstanding Arctic grayling fishery, among the finest in the world and at the extreme southern limit of the range of this salmonid. Catches in excess of 1000 fish per weekend outing were commonly reported up until the 1880s, when extensive logging in the area ruined the streams and habitat. Logging in the area commenced in earnest by European-American settlers between 1880 and 1910, with peak production occurring in the 1890s. Logging denuded habitat areas, with silt runoff and logging debris degrading the water quality of the river. 

The river's relatively large size, stable flows, and dearth of cataracts or other difficult passages made it ideal for the transportation of lumber. The wood was used to build the cities and towns of the Midwestern United States. Some of these logs became trapped at various points on the river, and can be seen today along the river bottom.

Watershed and Course

These deep glacial sands provide it with a remarkably stable flow of clean cold water year round, making it a popular river for fishing as well as canoeing.

Ecology
Native fluvial fish species in the Manistee River include brook trout (Salvelinus fontinalis) and the now extinct Arctic grayling (Thymallus arcticus). The Manistee River has undergone considerable physical and biological alterations over the past century. In addition to extensive past logging in the region, two hydroelectric dams act as barriers to migration. Native species also suffer from competition or predation by non-native introduced salmonids including brown trout (Salmo trutta), steelhead/rainbow trout (Oncorhynchus mykiss), coho salmon (Oncorhynchus kisutch), and Chinook salmon (Oncorhynchus tshawytscha).

An interest in reestablishing Arctic grayling in the river by the Little River Band of Ottawa Indians led to a recent analysis of habitat suitability for Arctic grayling in Big Manistee River tributaries and some regions of the main stem was conducted from 2011 to 2013. Abiotic habitat conditions such as temperature, gravel, and water quality were found suitable for re-introduction of grayling, once the dominant salmonid in the State of Michigan. Another study of found that tributaries with low densities of non-native brown trout may be ideal for Arctic grayling re-introduction, since two fish species (brook trout and slimy sculpin (Cottus cognatus) that currently and historically occurred with grayling were found in lower numbers when predatory brown trout were present.

Activities and Recreation
Today the river is used extensively for recreation, offering excellent conditions for canoeing, boating, and fishing.  Having been restored since the ravages of the logging era, the river is again considered among the finest trout and salmon rivers in the country.  Commercial navigation is possible in the lower stretches of the river below the Tippy Dam.

The Manistee River State Game Area is located upstream of Lake Manistee, and consists of areas of bayous and meandering marshlands located adjacent to the main river channel.  This state game area is managed by the Michigan Department of Natural Resources and contains a total area of 3,920 acres which overlay the Manistee River west of Manistee, Michigan.  The adjacent hunting and fishing areas include Tatches Bayou, Claybanks Bayou, and Anderson Bayou.  Duck hunting and northern pike fishing are popular activities within the managed marshland.

Bridges

Drainage basin 
The Manistee River drains land in the following counties:

 Antrim County
 Benzie County
 Crawford County
 Grand Traverse County
 Kalkaska County
 Lake County
 Manistee County
 Mason County
 Missaukee County
 Osceola County
 Otsego County

References

Rivers of Michigan
Rivers of Manistee County, Michigan
Rivers of Wexford County, Michigan
Rivers of Missaukee County, Michigan
Rivers of Kalkaska County, Michigan
Rivers of Antrim County, Michigan
Rivers of Otsego County, Michigan
Tributaries of Lake Michigan
Wild and Scenic Rivers of the United States